In enzymology, a nucleotide diphosphokinase is an enzyme that catalyzes the chemical reaction

ATP + nucleoside 5'-phosphate  AMP + 5'-phosphonucleoside 3'-diphosphate

Thus, the two substrates of this enzyme are ATP and nucleoside 5'-phosphate, whereas its two products are AMP and 5'-phosphonucleoside 3'-diphosphate.

This enzyme belongs to the family of transferases, specifically those transferring two phosphorus-containing groups (diphosphotransferases).  The systematic name of this enzyme class is ATP:nucleoside-5'-phosphate diphosphotransferase. Other names in common use include nucleotide pyrophosphokinase, ATP:nucleotide pyrophosphotransferase, ATP nucleotide 3'-pyrophosphokinase, and nucleotide 3'-pyrophosphokinase.

References

 
 
 

EC 2.7.6
Enzymes of unknown structure